Anthony Scaramucci (born January 6, 1964) is an American financier who briefly served as the White House Director of Communications from July 21 to July 31, 2017.

Scaramucci worked at Goldman Sachs's investment banking, equities, and private wealth management divisions between 1989 and 1996. After leaving Goldman Sachs, he founded Oscar Capital Management, and in 2005, he founded the investment firm SkyBridge Capital.

On July 21, 2017, Scaramucci was appointed White House Communications Director. Days into the job, Scaramucci provoked controversy after launching a strongly worded attack on members of the Trump Administration in an interview with The New Yorkers Ryan Lizza that he believed was off the record. Ten days after his appointment, he was dismissed by the new White House Chief of Staff, John F. Kelly, at the recommendation of President Donald Trump. He has since been critical of Trump in the media and voiced his support for Joe Biden in the 2020 election.

Early life
Scaramucci was born into an Italian-American family on January 6, 1964, on Long Island, New York, where he was raised in Port Washington. He is the son of Marie DeFeo Scaramucci and Alexander Scaramucci, who was a construction worker. His paternal grandfather, Alessandro Scaramucci, immigrated to the United States from Gualdo Tadino, Umbria. He had a middle-class upbringing and was the first generation of his family to attend college. He has an older brother, David, and a sister, Susan. Scaramucci graduated in 1982 from Paul D. Schreiber Senior High School in Port Washington, where he served as student council president. He earned a B.A. in economics at Tufts University and a J.D. at Harvard Law School where he overlapped with future president Barack Obama, future deputy attorney general Rod Rosenstein and future supreme court justice Neil Gorsuch, among others. Scaramucci credits his time and education at Harvard Law School as a springboard for his career in finance. Scaramucci has never practiced law and went to work at Goldman Sachs directly after graduating.

Career in investment banking
Scaramucci began his career at Goldman Sachs in 1989, in the Investment Banking division. A year later he was fired, then rehired two months later in the Equities division. In 1993, he became a vice president in the bank's Private Wealth Management division.

Oscar Capital Management
Scaramucci left Goldman in 1996 to launch Oscar Capital Management with his colleague Andrew Boszhardt. In 2001, Oscar Capital was sold to Neuberger Berman, and upon Neuberger Berman's sale to Lehman Brothers in 2003, Scaramucci served as a managing director in the firm's Investment Management division.

SkyBridge Capital
In 2005, Scaramucci founded SkyBridge Capital, a global alternative investment firm. Scaramucci is the chairman of the SkyBridge Alternatives Conference, or "SALT" Conference, launched in 2009. SALT hosts its annual flagship event in Las Vegas and an international event in the Fall/Winter. SALT has hosted large conferences in Singapore, Tokyo and, most recently, Abu Dhabi.

In 2011, Scaramucci received the Ernst & Young Entrepreneur of the Year Award New York Award in the Financial Services category, and in 2016 was ranked #85 in Worth magazine's "Power 100: The 100 Most Powerful People in Global Finance".

In May 2014, SkyBridge licensed the rights to Wall Street Week, a financial television news program formerly hosted by Louis Rukeyser on PBS. Scaramucci hosted the show. Broadcast rights were transferred to Fox Broadcasting Company in 2016.

On January 17, 2017, SkyBridge announced a majority stake sale to RON Transatlantic EG and HNA Capital (U.S.) Holding, a Chinese conglomerate with close ties to China's Communist Party. With the announcement, Scaramucci stepped down from his co-management role and ended his affiliation with SkyBridge and SALT. In April 2018, it was announced that Scaramucci would be returning to SkyBridge after the deal with HNA Group had collapsed due to the lack of approval of the Committee on Foreign Investment in the United States, an inter-agency government committee.

Political activities

Before 2016
Scaramucci supported the presidential campaigns of Hillary Clinton and Barack Obama. In 2008, Scaramucci was a fundraiser for Obama's presidential campaign. In September 2010, however, Scaramucci asked Obama at a CNBC event when he was going to "stop whacking Wall Street like a piñata."

Scaramucci has tweeted at various times that he has "always been for strong gun control laws" and that "Republicans should support gay marriage".

He served as the national finance co-chair for Mitt Romney's 2012 presidential campaign.

In 2015, on a Fox Business Network television appearance, Scaramucci called Trump a "hack politician" whose rhetoric is "anti-American and very, very divisive." He further warned Trump to "cut it out now", and "stop all this crazy rhetoric." In December 2015, Scaramucci criticized Trump's call for a border wall between Mexico and the U.S. He also criticized Trump for "making a fundamental mistake of trying to blame all of Islam and all Muslims for what is the ideology and the actions of a minority."

Ahead of the 2016 election, Scaramucci tweeted that he hoped Hillary Clinton would be the next president, but had turned against Clinton by 2015. During the 2016 Republican Party presidential primaries, Scaramucci first endorsed Scott Walker and later Jeb Bush. In May 2016, after Walker and Bush had withdrawn from the race, Scaramucci signed on to Donald Trump's political campaign by joining the Trump Finance Committee. In November 2016, he was appointed to the Presidential Transition Team Executive Committee of then-president-elect Trump.

Announcement of Office of Public Liaison leadership 
On January 12, 2017, Scaramucci was named Assistant to President Trump and director of the White House Office of Public Liaison and Intergovernmental Affairs. On January 23, he told New York magazine: the "thing I have learned about these people in Washington is they have no money. So what happens when they have no fucking money is they write about what seat they are in and what the title is. Fucking congressmen act like that. They are fucking jackasses". On the topic of working in Washington DC, he said: "[…] that's Washington. That's how they operate. They try to caricaturise you, and dehumanise you, so that you lose your voice. They wanted to get me by grinding out a public image of me that is dramatically different from the reality."

Scaramucci attended the World Economic Forum in Davos January 16–17 as the representative for the Trump transition team. Part of his mission was to reassure attendees about the incoming Trump administration. Following Chinese President Xi Jinping, he gave a talk warning against protectionism and championing free trade.

Fox Business reported on January 31, 2017, that "Scaramucci's delayed appointment underscores some of the tensions building inside the Trump White House, as various aides and advisers continue to jockey for his attention and to retain and expand their power". According to Politico, on January 31, 2017, with Scaramucci's appointment still pending approval by the United States Office of Government Ethics (OGE), Trump's chief of staff Reince Priebus called Scaramucci "to tell him he should pull out of consideration". They reported that Priebus opposed Scaramucci's appointment because of Scaramucci's stake in SkyBridge Capital. Several senior White House officials questioned the significance of any internal feuding in Scaramucci's appointment delay, however, officials have cited the lengthy process to conclude his sale of SkyBridge as the reason of the delay in his appointment. Reuters reported on February 1 that Scaramucci would not get the director role. In a February 2017 New York magazine article, Priebus was quoted as saying rumors that he interfered with the hiring were "not true".

On March 6, 2017, the White House announced the appointment of Ideagen founder and former CEO George Sifakis as director for the Office of Public Liaison, instead of Scaramucci. The next day, Politico reported that Priebus was still considering offering  Scaramucci a role in the administration.

On June 26, 2017, three network investigative journalists—Thomas Frank, Eric Lichtblau, and Lex Haris—resigned from CNN after the network retracted a story that connected Scaramucci to a $10 billion Russian investment fund. CNN issued an apology to Scaramucci (who accepted the apology), with the network saying the online story (which appeared on CNN's website and was not aired on television) did not meet its editorial standards. Scaramucci said the original story was not true; CNN did not say the story was false, but said that it "wasn't solid enough" to be published.

Export–Import Bank of the United States
Effective June 19, 2017, Scaramucci was named senior vice president and chief strategy officer for the U.S. Export-Import Bank. He was also still under consideration for a post as ambassador to the Organisation for Economic Co-operation and Development.

White House Communications Director
On July 21, 2017, President Donald Trump appointed Scaramucci White House Communications Director. The White House announcement of Scaramucci said he would "report directly to the President" rather than to the White House chief of staff, as White House Press Secretary Sean Spicer had. On the day that Scaramucci's appointment was announced, Spicer resigned. The New York Times reported that he had done so after advising Trump that he "vehemently disagreed" with the appointment of Scaramucci. Trump's chief of staff Reince Priebus also had "vehement objections" to his hiring.
On July 26, 2017, journalist Ryan Lizza reported that Scaramucci called him to try to identify who leaked information about a meeting to The New Yorker. During the call, he revealed some disagreements with Priebus and White House advisor Steve Bannon. Scaramucci believed the conversation to be off the record.

During the interview and in a tweet immediately afterward, Scaramucci said that he had contacted or would be contacting the FBI and the Department of Justice, asking them to investigate Priebus for allegedly "leaking" his financial-disclosure form to  Politico reporter Lorraine Woellert. Scaramucci later deleted the tweet. Woellert stated publicly that she obtained the information from the U.S. Export-Import Bank.

On July 28, Priebus's resignation as chief of staff was announced; Priebus said that he had resigned the previous day. Also on July 28, Trump announced that he had named retired general John F. Kelly as his new chief of staff.

On July 31, Trump dismissed Scaramucci from his role as communications director on the recommendation of Kelly, who wanted him removed because he did not think Scaramucci was disciplined and believed Scaramucci had lost his credibility. As one of his first acts after being sworn in as chief of staff, Kelly reportedly invited Scaramucci to his office and told him he was being let go. An official White House statement indicated that Scaramucci "will be leaving" his post "to give Chief of Staff John Kelly a clean slate and the ability to build his own team." Scaramucci's tenure of eleven days is tied for shortest in history for that position with Jack Koehler in the Reagan administration, leading some commentators to compare similarly short political position tenures in units of Scaramuccis.

Anti-Trump political activities, 2019–2020
In July 2019, Scaramucci predicted that Trump would win "40+ states in 2020" but turned against Trump shortly thereafter, strongly criticizing Trump's attacks against women of color as "racist and unacceptable." In August 2019, Scaramucci said that he no longer supported Trump's reelection campaign.

Scaramucci cited Trump's conduct during his visits in the aftermath of mass shootings in El Paso and Dayton; during Trump's visit to a grieving El Paso, Trump attacked his Democratic opponents, boasted about his rally crowd sizes, and was photographed making the "thumbs-up" gesture next to a baby orphaned in the shooting. Scaramucci said that Trump's visit was a "catastrophe" and that Trump was "actually dissembling a little bit, and he's sounding more and more nonsensical." Scaramucci said he remained a registered Republican, but could not support Trump "because he's lost his mind." Trump responded with a series of tweets attacking Scaramucci.

In June 2020, Scaramucci joined with Matt Borges and other well-known Republican operatives to launch Right Side PAC, a super PAC aiming to prevent Trump's re-election as president and support his Democratic opponent, Joe Biden. Scaramucci served as an adviser to the group. He was one of multiple other Trump former officials to endorse Biden.

Other activities

Books
He is the author of four books:
 Goodbye Gordon Gekko: How to Find Your Fortune Without Losing Your Soul (2010)
 The Little Book of Hedge Funds: What You Need to Know About Hedge Funds but the Managers Won't Tell You (2012)
 Hopping Over the Rabbit Hole: How Entrepreneurs Turn Failure Into Success (2016)
 Trump, the Blue-Collar President (2018)

Appearances in media
Scaramucci paid $100,000 to have SkyBridge's logo in the film Wall Street: Money Never Sleeps (2010), along with two cameo appearances.

He joined Fox Business Network as a contributor in 2014, and in March 2016 served as host of the financial television show Wall Street Week.

On January 13, 2019, it was announced Scaramucci would be a participant in the second American season of the reality show competition Celebrity Big Brother; though, in a twist, it was revealed he was a Fake HouseGuest on the show.

On January 30, 2023, Scaramucci appeared in episode 39 of the podcast Mislaibeled. During the hour-long conversation, Scaramucci criticized Trump and his cabinet, and blamed Wikipedia for some misinformation about himself.

Business ventures
Scaramucci, along with restaurateur Eytan Sugarman and financier Nelson Braff, founded the Hunt & Fish Club steakhouse and seafood restaurant in Midtown Manhattan in New York City, which opened in 2015.

On October 2, 2017, Scaramucci launched an online media venture called the Scaramucci Post. At a press conference, Scaramucci said that "we have no idea what the Scaramucci Post is and neither do you. But, we launched it today and we launched with great fanfare and so we'll have to see how the whole thing unfolds." Later that month, the Post was criticized for posting a Twitter poll asking "How many Jews were killed in the Holocaust?". The tweet was posted by Scaramucci's business partner Lance Laifer without the approval of Scaramucci, who was in London at the time; when he found out about the tweet, Scaramucci was reportedly furious at Laifer. The tweet was soon taken down, and Scaramucci subsequently wrote that "If anyone was offended by this act, you have both my sincere personal apology and commitment that it will never happen again", and pledged to donate $25,000 to the Simon Wiesenthal Center. Subsequently, however, the Post tweeted that they had changed their mind on the poll, defending their decision to post it and accusing their critics of "laziness and mob-mentality", claiming that the poll was designed to illustrate that memory was fading about the death of 6 million Jews.

Tufts controversy 
In June 2016, Scaramucci joined the Board of Advisors of the Fletcher School of Law and Diplomacy, located at his alma mater of Tufts University. In early November 2017, 240 Tufts students, faculty, and alumni signed an online petition calling for Scaramucci's removal from the position. One Fletcher graduate student, Camilo Caballero, wrote a pair of op-eds in Tufts' independent student newspaper, The Tufts Daily, on November 6 and 13. On November 21, 2017, lawyers representing Scaramucci sent a cease-and-desist letter to the Daily, alleging that the op-eds contained factual inaccuracies which attempted to defame him. The letter demanded that Caballero and the Daily issue a retraction and an apology for its allegedly "defamatory" statements, threatening a lawsuit if the paper did not comply within five business days. The Daily opted to keep the full text of the editorials on its website while publishing publicly the cease-and-desist letter on November 27, 2017. That evening, members of the Tufts Community Union (TCU) Senate, the main student government body at Tufts University, publicly called on the university to remove Scaramucci from the Fletcher School's Board of Advisors. On November 28, 2017, Scaramucci resigned his position.

Board memberships
He is a trustee of the United States Olympic & Paralympic Foundation. He is also a member of the Council on Foreign Relations. Scaramucci was a member of the New York City Financial Services Advisory Committee from 2007 to 2012.

Honorary citizenship
In February 2021 it was announced that he would become a honorary citizen of the ancient Italian town of Gualdo Tadino, from which his paternal family originated. The mayor and the municipal council bestowed Scaramucci with the status on March 15, 2021, with a unanimous vote citing his remarkable professional and political achievements, his deep attachment to his Italian roots and the important role his family played in the history and development of the town.

Personal life

Scaramucci's first marriage was to Lisa Miranda. They separated in 2011 after 23 years of marriage, and their divorce was finalized in 2014.

His second marriage is with Deidre Ball. Ball worked in investor relations for SkyBridge Capital until Scaramucci left the firm. The couple first dated in 2011 and married on July 11, 2014, after having their first child together in early 2014. Scaramucci and Ball separated briefly in early 2017. Ball filed for divorce from Scaramucci in early July 2017 when she was pregnant with their second child, to whom she gave birth on July 24, 2017, but she dropped the divorce case on November 29, 2017. The couple worked out their marital problems and in September 2018 began a Radio.com podcast titled "Mooch and the Mrs.", in which they discuss their world view from opposite political stances, while managing their relationship.

In April 2016, Scaramucci and two other New York Mets fans bought Mike Piazza's jersey from the September 21, 2001, game against the Atlanta Braves, the first professional baseball game played in New York following the 9/11 attacks, in which Piazza hit a game-winning 8th-inning home run. The jersey was purchased in a private auction for $365,000, the highest price ever paid for a modern-day jersey, which Scaramucci described as having "tremendous artistic symbolism". The new owners wanted the jersey accessible to fans, so it will be displayed on a rotating basis among the 9/11 Memorial Museum, Citi Field, and the National Baseball Hall of Fame.

Television

References

External links

1964 births
21st-century American non-fiction writers
American financial writers
American financiers
American hedge fund managers
American male non-fiction writers
American people of Italian descent
American podcasters
Celebrity Big Brother
Contestants on American game shows
Goldman Sachs people
Harvard Law School alumni
Living people
New York (state) Republicans
Paul D. Schreiber Senior High School alumni
People from Manhasset, New York
People from Port Washington, New York
People of Umbrian descent
Trump administration personnel
Tufts University School of Arts and Sciences alumni
White House Communications Directors
Writers from New York (state)
21st-century American male writers